The Crystal Maze is a British game show devised by Jacques Antoine, based upon his format for the French game show Fort Boyard, and produced for Channel 4. The programme focuses on teams of contestants, a mixed group of men and women, attempting a range of challenges to earn time required to help them complete one final challenge, which if completed successfully earns them a prize. The premise of the show is themed around challenges set to different periods of human history within a fictional labyrinth of time and space (the titular "Crystal Maze"), and is notable for the use of golf ball-sized Swarovski glass crystals (referred to as "time crystals") as a reward for each challenge successfully completed by contestants, and lock-in conditions for contestants that ran out of time or broke a three-strikes rule on a challenge.

The Crystal Maze originally consisted of six series, including five Christmas specials involving teams of children, which aired between 15 February 1990 to 10 August 1995. The first four series and three specials were hosted by Richard O'Brien, with the remaining two series and specials hosted by Edward Tudor-Pole. In October 2016, Channel 4 created a one-off celebrity edition for Stand Up to Cancer, hosted by Stephen Merchant. In 2017, the broadcaster began airing new episodes of the game, after reviving it following the 2016 special, revamping its format and creating several standard episodes along additional celebrity specials, and appointing Richard Ayoade as host. This run was cancelled after three series with the final episodes airing in 2020.

A 10-episode American version of the show, filmed on the same set as the UK version, aired on Nickelodeon in 2020.

In March 2016, The Crystal Maze Live Experience opened, allowing the public to buy tickets and compete in a replica of the game show's zones and challenges.

Creation
The Crystal Mazes origins can be traced to an attempt to create an edition of Fort Boyard for British Television, commissioned by Channel 4 in 1989 from Chatsworth Television. Complications in creating a pilot arose due to the fortress used by the TV game show, situated off the west coast of France, being unavailable for filming due to its ongoing refurbishments that year. As a result, the pilot was filmed in London at Elstree Studios, using a basic replica set funded by Channel 4, but the end result was deemed unsuccessful and not broadcast, due to the considerable changes required to the French-owned format in order for it to suit a UK audience.

In order to create a more successful format for Channel 4, who had commissioned a full series, Chatsworth Television producer  Malcolm Heyworth contacted Fort Boyard's creator Jacques Antoine - who attended the pilot's creation, and who had created the company's other productions: Treasure Hunt, and Interceptor - and proposed creating an alternative format which conducted challenges within themed zones. Antoine eventually provided a rough sketch to the producers when taking them to Paris to view a full-size Crystal Dome created by the French, revealing it would be the centrepiece and surrounded by four other sets. The sketch was used as inspiration for the concept of The Crystal Maze, which was developed in just "two days", creating a show which although was similar to Fort Boyard, had substantial differences in presentation and style, creating a show akin to Dungeons & Dragons, with the host acting as the Dungeon Master.

Format

Each team that compete on The Crystal Maze undertake a series of challenges (referred to as games). Teams begin at a pre-determined zone, whereupon they compete in a finite number of games in each zone, accruing as many time crystals as they can before travelling to the large "Crystal Dome" at the centre of the maze to meet their final challenge. Upon entering a game's cell, the objective is usually determined by either a clear written message or cryptic clue. The remainder of the team watch their progress either through a cell's windows or monitors depending on the zone aesthetic, and may give advice to the contestant unless stipulated otherwise. The host will serve reminders of the time limit and of any special rules, and generally will not give hints unless the contestant is struggling badly.

Each game falls under one of four categories:

Each game presents the potential of being locked within a game's cell. If locked in, the contestant is unable to take any further part in proceedings unless they are released by their team captain at the cost of an earned Crystal. If the team's captain is locked in, the vice-captain takes over and may select a new vice-captain to replace them and so on. Reduction in team members poses an increased difficulty for future games and at their final challenge.

There are two ways a lock-in can occur in The Crystal Maze, if a contestant exceeds their time limit within the cell or an "automatic lock-in" where they breach a game's special rules or restrictions, irrespective of their progress in obtaining the crystal. This is outlined prior to a contestant entering the cell by the Maze Master.

Once the team arrives at the Crystal Dome, they are told how much time that they have to complete the final challenge, based on the number of crystals they have brought with them (five seconds for each crystal they had at the end of the game). At this point, the team enter the Dome, and upon the challenge beginning, they must collect as many gold foil tokens as they can and deposit them into a container along a wall of the Dome, while avoiding any silver tokens mixed in with them; these are blown about by fans beneath the floor of the Dome. Once time is up, the fans are switched off and no more tokens can be deposited into the container; a slot is opened during the challenge, which closes up when the time is up. Once the team is outside the dome, they, along with any members who were not present for the final challenge, are given the tally of their efforts by the host. If the team accumulate a total of 100 gold tokens or more, after deduction of any silver tokens, the team wins the grand prize that they chose for themselves before partaking in the show. All contestants who participate in the show win a commemorative crystal saying "I Cracked the Crystal Maze", which acts as a consolation prize if a team fails to secure the required number of gold tokens.

Original series 
During the run of the original series between 1990 and 1995, teams consisted of three men and three women, each aged between 16 and 40, who were put together by the production team and did not know each other before appearing on the show From their pre-determined starting zone, teams either travelled clockwise or counter-clockwise around the maze, engaging in at least three games in each zone, sometimes being given the opportunity to play a fourth game in a zone during their trip around the maze. Between the first and fourth series, the total number of games that could be played varied between 14 and 16 per episode, but for the fifth and sixth series, the number of games played was reduced to a standard of 13. Throughout the run, 3D maps of varying sophistication were used to highlight where the host and team were. Until the end of the third series, each contestant on the team could win a prize for themselves that they chose at a later date (a selection of the available prizes would be read out as if that was theirs but the allocation was sometimes in-jokes based on things that happened during the recording), if the team succeeded at collecting 100 or more gold tokens, but from the fourth series, this format was changed to the team choosing a prize that they shared together if they won the final challenge. During the first series, a runner-up prize could also be chosen by each member of a team, which they won if the final tally of tokens was between 50 and 99, but this format was dropped by the start of the second series.

During the Christmas specials, the teams consisted of similar setup, with each aged between 10 and 15, and selected by the production team. While the format was similar to the adult version, there were notable differences, such as easier games with fewer chances of a lock-in, more lenient time limits and additional clues from the host. The prize would always be awarded at the end, irrespective of achievement.

Revived series 
Following the one-off Stand Up to Cancer edition, Channel 4 revived the show featuring the original setup of zones, the same map design from the SU2C special, and a newly designed taller set. The format of the show was revamped to have five contestants who have a prior connection (family, colleagues, etc.) and a reduction in games to ten.

In a similar vein to the 2016 SU2C special, a series of celebrity episodes was initially broadcast. The contestants taking part were given an extra crystal upon reaching the Dome (or by completing an additional task during the show) to add to those that they had brought, and would earn cash for Stand Up to Cancer depending on how many gold tokens they got, after deduction of silver. Contestants earn £5,000 for less than 50 gold tokens, £10,000 for 50 to 99 tokens, and £20,000 for 100 or more tokens.

The 2019 series introduces the "Mega Crystal", a noticeably larger version of the Crystals within the Maze. The team has one opportunity to earn the Mega Crystal, and the team captain decides before each game whether they want that game to be played for the Mega Crystal. If the team earns the Mega Crystal, it grants them ten seconds of time (instead of the standard five) in the Crystal Dome.

Hosts 
Throughout its history, The Crystal Maze has been presented by a series of hosts known as Maze Masters. Each takes on the role of the Maze's custodian responsible for guiding each team around the various zones, keeping them updated on their progress, leading each nominated team member to the respective games, acting as the timekeeper on all games and the final challenge at the Dome, and taking safe custody of each crystal won by the team.

The short monologue to camera scenes originated when O'Brien began joking with the cameramen during filming of an episode. When the production team reviewed the footage and realized what it could bring to the show they "asked him to do it all the time"; O'Brien felt that looking straight at the camera "unknowingly added a complicity between me and the audience at home". However, he also "often appeared detached from proceedings, bordering on deadpan". Each successive host has continued these monologues, adding their own variant to the show.

Other characters 
Whilst the Maze is home to the Maze Master, several original characters have appeared whether as part of a particular game such as a jailor, guard and tribal priest, or are otherwise fictionalized within a respective zone.  None of the characters appear in the American version. Notable characters include:

 Mumsie and Auntie Sabrina Portrayed by Sandra Caron, Mumsie is a genial fortune teller during O'Brien's tenure, hosting a recurring mental game in the Medieval Zone that involved brain teaser questions; Caron portrayed Mumsie for the first, second and fourth series of the original run, and Auntie Sabrina for the third series, who was described by O'Brien as taking over while his Mumsie was away. Both characters were portrayed as friendly to the contestants, with Mumsie sometimes being overly motherly with O'Brien, and often talked about her affair she was having with a man called "Ralph" to both the contestants and audience during the first and second series, showing disapproval of her next affair with man called "Dwayne" during the fourth series. Mumsie departed with O'Brien at the start of the fifth series. In The Crystal Maze Live Experience, Mumsie is an unseen character which the Maze Master communicates with through an earpiece.
 The Computer An operating system for the Futuristic Zone is situated within; if the team's starting point is this zone, the computer provides a question for the team that they must answer correctly to gain entry into the Maze. During O'Brien's tenure (with the exception of series 2), the computer had a male voice and usually acted antagonistically towards him. During Tudor-Pole's tenure, the computer adopted a female voice and was named Barbara. In Ayoade's tenure, the computer retains a female voice but no other personality traits are shown, only speaking when a team seeks entry to the maze.
 The Riddle Master Portrayed by Adam Buxton, the Riddle Master, credited as Jarhead, is a head that resides in a glass jar who creates Crystals by mixing potions using telekinesis when a contestant completes his game. Though primarily in the Futuristic zone, he has appeared in other zones where his jar changes aesthetic. He has a friendly, though seemingly subservient, relationship to Ayoade.
 Knight Marion Portrayed by Jessica Hynes, Marion is a King's Knight and guard of the Medieval Zone who wears oversized battle armour, carries a large sword, and grants entry. She was known to ask Ayoade to attend events with her, which he rebuffed. When Medieval was replaced with Eastern, she did not return.

Filming
Each episode had a budget of £125,000 and was filmed over a period of two days at the show's studio. During the first day of shooting, the team, followed by multiple cameras, tackle all the games and discover their fate in the crystal dome in the style of a "live" shoot. The close up of contestants, leaping and grabbing tokens was usually recorded while the actual collection was being counted, actual collection of tokens was normally done on hands and knees as the token settled round the sides of the dome. The following day then focuses on acquiring close-up shots of gameplay with a single camera, requiring team members to return to games they had already won or lost (second day shots can be identified by the lack of mikes on contestants). An entire series requires about five weeks to be filmed, with three episodes produced per week. Each series of the show featured its own portfolio of games: 37 different game designs in series 1, and between 41 and 49 games in each subsequent series.

The set
Every episode, with the exception of the 2016 special, is filmed on a very large custom built set. The set, designed by James Dillon for both the original run and the revived series, is divided into five parts, four of which are named as zones, set in different periods of time and space, which house the games that contestants take on, while the final part, called the Crystal Dome, houses the final challenge that the team tackle together towards the end of the episode. The theme of each zone is not only reflected via its time period, but also in the time-keeping devices, the design of the games, and how the host and team entered and moves between the zones. As of 2019, six zones have been used within the Maze.

Zones

Location
After the first series, the production team decided to expand the maze, relocating the set to an adapted aircraft hangar, Hangar 6, operated by Aces High Studios at North Weald Airfield in Essex. After the show ended in 1995, when Channel 4's contract with producers Chatsworth TV expired, the set was eventually dismantled. When the broadcaster decided to make a one-off edition of the show for Stand Up for Cancer in 2016, the episode was filmed at The Crystal Maze live immersive experience in London, as it was no longer possible to use the original set. When Channel 4 made the decision to revive the show for a full series in November 2016, James Dillon was asked to design a new set at a  warehouse at The Bottle Yard Studios in Bristol. Dillon went back to his original plans and sketches but took the opportunity to build and expand on several of his original ideas and concepts. The most drastic change is that the Crystal Dome is actually located in a separate part of the studio; originally its proximity to the Aztec zone caused a problem with sand contaminating the Dome area.

Theme tune
The theme tune for The Crystal Maze was composed by Zack Laurence and is entitled "Force Field". It was used through all six original series, with an updated version being used for the new series. The original track is one minute and five seconds long; however it was shortened for the opening and ending titles. Likewise, the new re-recorded version of the theme lasts for 33 seconds. The "Underscore" remix of the theme tune played during the show itself was also composed by Laurence.

Reception
At its height, viewing figures regularly scored over 4 million, peaking at 5.9 million in 1992 when the show was nominated for its first BAFTA award. Three other BAFTA nominations followed in subsequent years with a Royal Television Society award nomination in 1995. 
Although not originally envisioned as a children's show over 40% of the shows viewers were under 16, a surprise to the crew and O'Brien, who adapted his performance accordingly, forcing himself to think more like a child.
Contemporary commentary has often suggested that this aspect of O'Brien's performance was the show's biggest attraction. Praising his zany style and describing him as "a fearless adventurer with a wink and a smile and a verbal knife in the back of those poor saps [contestants] ... His style and wit was sardonic, yet never exclusionary, and pointed, yet never bitter". In 2012 The Guardian'''s TV & Radio Blog listed O'Brien as one of the six "most loved" game show hosts, describing him as "an unconventional choice for an unconventional series ... [who] looked more like a dandy gazelle than a game show host". The same commentary has also suggested Tudor-Pole had an almost impossible task in living up to O'Brien's popularity. The Guardian claimed "It was no surprise that the show went downhill after [O'Brien's] exit."

The show has had a lasting impact and influence on British television, becoming what has been described as a cult classic due to repeats; the makers of the children's TV show Jungle Run openly acknowledge The Crystal Maze as an influence, particularly the final host, Michael Underwood, who was the team captain in the first Christmas special; The perceived stupidity of the contestants was the target of various British comedy shows and spoofs, a trend which continued well into the mid 2000s.

Merchandise

Home Entertainment
A single-player computer game based on The Crystal Maze was developed by Digital Jellyfish Design and released in 1993. A game for mobiles was released in 2008, and later for iOS in 2010.

In 1991, MB Games released a board game loosely based upon the show. The concept of the game differed significantly from the show with players competing against each other as opposed to the co-operative style of the TV show.

For the revived series, Rascals Products Limited produced a new board game. The game itself features sixteen challenges which can be played either individually or as a team, with an optional timer to use on smartphones and tablets. In 2019 an expansion for the Eastern zone was released which can replace any existing zone on the main board and comes with four new games.

The Crystal Maze Live Experience
In June 2015, the interactive theatre production company Little Lion Entertainment announced that a "live immersive experience" of The Crystal Maze would be taking place in late 2015, funded successfully through an Indiegogo crowdfunding campaign. Located in central London, the Live Experience admits members of the public, who can buy tickets and play the show for themselves. In the Live Experience, Richard O'Brien is shown leaving the Maze to "the new custodian" who guides the team. In the London experience, four teams enter the maze at separate locations, and rotate around the four zones simultaneously before competing against each other in The Crystal Dome. In the Manchester experience, the zones are split in two parts, and the teams move through the maze one after the other, such that each half-zone always has one team in it. Like the London Maze, teams compete for the high score in the Crystal Dome, by collecting as many gold tokens as possible, but unlike in London, the teams never meet or compete against one another. The group secured a venue for the Maze in the King's Cross area in late 2015, and it opened for contestants on 15 March 2016. In November 2016 another live experience in Manchester at the Granada Studios opened to the public in April 2017.

The Cyberdrome Crystal Maze
The Cyberdrome Crystal Maze was an attraction usually found in bowling alleys and video arcades in the UK. It allowed entrants an opportunity to play the Crystal Maze in a computerised format. As this feature lacked a host, rules regarding lock ins were changed. The locations of the Cyberdromes were Blackpool, Pembrokeshire, Southampton, Coventry, and Maidenhead with an additional location in Japan.

Quiz machines
Chatsworth Television licensed a number of popular SWP gambling machines based on the TV series. In 2009, Cool Games created a 3D video version for the UK SWP market. Remaining true to the original show, using touch screen technology, the game achieved widespread coverage in the UK and remains one of the most popular SWP games launched.

Literature

VHS releases
In 1994, a video cassette, The Best of The Crystal Maze'' was released by Wienerworld Presentation. The video included three episodes: the 1992 and 1993 Christmas specials, and an episode from Series 4. It also featured the clip of O'Brien and Mumsey leaving the maze.

Transmissions

Original

Revival

American adaptation
On June 3, 2019, it was announced that an American version of the show would premiere on Nickelodeon and feature family members competing for $25,000. The ten-episode season was filmed in the same location as the British edition. In December 2019, it was announced that comedian Adam Conover would be the Maze Master for this version. It debuted on the North American version of the channel with a commercial-free premiere which aired on January 24, 2020 and was later broadcast in the UK from September 4, 2020.

In the American adaptation, each team played a total of eight games in the maze (two per zone). The Mega Crystal introduced in 2019 in the original series was available in any game after the first. If a team finished the Crystal Dome with a positive total of gold tokens, they won $100 per gold after deductions for silver tokens, and the full $25,000 for a net result of 100 gold tokens or more.

Episodes

Notes

References

External links
 
 
 

1990 British television series debuts
2020 British television series endings
1990s British game shows
2010s British game shows
2020s British game shows
2020s Nickelodeon original programming
British television series revived after cancellation
Channel 4 game shows
English-language television shows
Nickelodeon game shows
Television series by Banijay